Mount Barker may refer to:
 District Council of Mount Barker, a local government area in South Australia

 Mount Barker, South Australia, a town
 Mount Barker railway station, South Australia
 Mount Barker Road, South Australia
 Mount Barker (South Australia), a mountain
 Mount Barker, Western Australia, a town

See also
Barker (disambiguation)